Ncell Football is an initiative that was introduced by the Nepal-based telecommunications firm, Ncell in 2012.

Tournament portfolio
Ncell Cup: A national-level tournament of 16 A-Division teams.
Ncell Women's Cup: A district-level 27 team competition of the best women teams in Nepal.
Ncell Youth Cup: A district-level U-15 tournament between 45 district teams. The tournament (alongside the Coca Cola Cup Inter-School Tournament) acts as a selection process for the SAFF U-16 Championship and the AFC U-16 Championship qualifiers.

Football development
In 2012, Ncell provided a 1-year sponsorship deal to the Nepal women's national football team in its commitment to ensure that the team enters the 2014 SAFF Women's Championship. Moreover, the firm also awards a Ncell Player of the Year award through voting system of the selection of the year's best football players in Nepal.

See more
Football in Nepal

References

External links

Ncell
Women's football in Nepal
Ncell Cup
2012 establishments in Nepal